Henrik Frandsen (born 8 February 1961) is a Danish politician serving as Member of the Folketing for the Moderates since the 2022 election. He was formerly mayor of Tønder Municipality.

Career 
Frandsen stood as a candidate for Venstre in the 2013 Danish local elections, but lost to incumbent party fellow Laurids Rudebeck. Laurids died in 2016 allowing Frandsen to take over the position as mayor. Following the 2017 Danish local elections, Frandsen was able to continue as mayor after a gain of one seat in the municipal council.

In 2020 Frandsen founded his own local party, Tønder Listen, after Venstre announced that their new candidate for the mayor position was Martin Iversen. At the 2021 Danish local elections, Tønder Listen was the party with the most votes in Tønder Municipality, gaining 27% of the vote, but not enough to ensure Frandsen could continue as mayor. Jørgen Popp Petersen replaced Frandsen as mayor. 

In August 2022 Frandsen announced he would be joining the newly-founded party Moderaterne led by former Venstre leader Lars Løkke Rasmussen. He subsequently won a seat in the Folketing in the 2022 Danish general election receiving 6,206 personal votes.

Personal life 
Frandsen is married and has three children. Before entering politics, he worked as a swine farmer. He sold his farm in 2018.

References 

21st-century Danish politicians
1961 births
Members of the Folketing 2022–2026
Living people
Moderates (Denmark) politicians
20th-century Danish farmers
21st-century Danish farmers